Richard Marvin Hansen  (born August 26, 1957) is a Canadian track and field athlete (Paralympic Games), activist, and philanthropist for people with disabilities. Following a pickup truck crash at the age of 15, Hansen sustained a spinal cord injury and became a paraplegic. Hansen is most famous for his Man in Motion World Tour, in which he circled the globe in a wheelchair to raise funds for charity. He was inducted into Canada's Sports Hall of Fame in 2006. He was one of the final torchbearers in the 1988 Winter Olympics and the 2010 Winter Olympics. He was profiled and spoke during the 2010 Winter Paralympics opening ceremony.

Early life
Born in Port Alberni, British Columbia in 1957, Rick Hansen grew up in Williams Lake, British Columbia. He had an active childhood, where he played volleyball, baseball, softball, and basketball. He often spent time outdoors with his father and grandfather who took him fishing.

On June 27, 1973, Rick and a friend were riding in the back of a pickup truck when the driver lost control of the vehicle and hit a tree. The impact threw Rick and his friend from the vehicle, resulting in a spinal injury that left Rick paralyzed from the waist down.

He worked on rehabilitation, completed high school, and became the first student with a physical disability to graduate in physical education from the University of British Columbia. Hansen won national championships on wheelchair volleyball and wheelchair basketball teams. He went on to become a world class champion wheelchair marathoner and Paralympic athlete. He competed in wheelchair racing at both the 1980 and 1984 Summer Paralympics, winning a total of six medals; three gold, two silver, and one bronze. Hansen won 19 international wheelchair marathons, including three world championships. He also coached high school basketball and volleyball. Rick had a very close relationship with his family, especially with his father and grandfather, with whom he enjoyed frequent fishing trips.

Man in Motion World Tour

In 1980, fellow British Columbian and Canadian athlete Terry Fox, who had lost a leg to bone cancer, undertook the Marathon of Hope, intending to run across Canada from Newfoundland to Vancouver Island to raise awareness for cancer research. He made it from St. John's, Newfoundland to Thunder Bay, Ontario before a cancer recurrence forced him to stop, about halfway through his journey. Inspired by Terry's courage, Hansen decided to undertake a similar journey to prove the potential of people with disabilities and to inspire a more accessible world. But his planned path was far more ambitious: he planned to circle the world in his wheelchair.

He embarked on his Man in Motion World Tour on March 21, 1985, from Oakridge Mall in Vancouver. Although public attention was low at the beginning of the tour, he soon attracted international media attention as he progressed on a 26-month trek, logging 40,075 km through 34 countries on four continents (North America, Europe, Oceania, and Asia) before crossing Canada. He averaged 8 hours of wheeling and 85 km a day. His highest summit was in the Swiss Alps at 5,577 ft (1700 metres). He returned to Vancouver's BC Place Stadium to cheering crowds of thousands on May 22, 1987, after raising $26 million for spinal cord research and quality of life initiatives. Like Terry Fox, he was hailed as an international hero.

Today, the wheelchair and many other items associated with the Man in Motion World Tour are preserved by the BC Sports Hall of Fame and Museum. The song "St. Elmo's Fire (Man in Motion)" was written in his honour by Canadian record producer and composer David Foster and British musician John Parr, and performed by Parr for the soundtrack of the film St. Elmo's Fire. It reached No. 1 on the Billboard Hot 100 in the United States in September 1985.

Post-tour career

Hansen is currently president and CEO of the Rick Hansen Foundation, which has generated more than $200 million for spinal cord injury-related programs.

Rick Hansen Foundation
The Hansen Foundation was established in 1988, following the completion of Rick Hansen's Man in Motion World Tour, to continue raising funds and awareness to create a world without barriers for people with disabilities. For nearly 30 years, the Foundation has been actively improving the lives of people with disabilities, changing perceptions and breaking down barriers. The vision of the organization is to create an inclusive world where people with disabilities can reach their full potential. Through programs, collaboration and leadership, the Foundation has increased awareness and solutions for the barriers people with disabilities face, created more accessible spaces, improved the quality of life and health outcomes for people with spinal cord injuries, mobility issues and other disabilities.

In addition, the Foundation operates three major programs. The Rick Hansen School Program is designed for students from grades one to twelve, and teaches inclusiveness, disability awareness and leadership. Meanwhile, an online accessibility-related travel tool and consumer ratings guide called planat was also launched in 2011. The Foundation also provides Quality of Life grants to recipients every year.

During 2011 and 2012, the Foundation was also part of a cross-Canada tour called the Rick Hansen 25th Anniversary Relay that followed the same route as Hansen's original Man in Motion Tour, roughly 25 years after it began.

ICORD, Blusson Spinal Cord Centre and Rick Hansen Institute

Hansen was noted as "the driving force" in the development of the 48 million dollars raised for the International Collaboration of Repair Discoveries (ICORD), an information network designed to track and record "best practices" in spinal cord treatment across the country and internationally. ICORD also maintains the Rick Hansen Spinal Cord Injury Registry, allowing doctors and experts across the country to share vital information on what works and what doesn't for specific kinds of spinal cord injuries.

ICORD is located inside the Blusson Spinal Cord Centre, which is also home to the Brenda and David McLean Integrated Spine Clinic, which provides one-stop outpatient care for people with spinal cord injuries or diseases of the spine, as well as the Rick Hansen Institute (formerly the Spinal Cord Injuries Solutions Network).

The building was designed to be fully accessible, with no need to display the wheelchair disability sign, and integrates research with care.

The province has previously contributed $17.25 million to spinal cord injury research and quality of life – $2.25 million to the B.C. Leadership Chair in Spinal Cord Research at the Rick Hansen Institute at UBC and $15 million to the Rick Hansen Foundation in support of its ongoing work to help improve the lives of people with disabilities.

Other initiatives
Hansen is a supporter of the conservation of sturgeon. Hansen contributed to the Fraser River Sturgeon Conservation Society with the money earned from the book Tale of the Great White Fish. Additionally, he has served as chair for both Fraser River Sturgeon Conservation Society and the Pacific Salmon Endowment Fund Society, helping to restore and protect sturgeon and salmon populations in British Columbia.

In 2017, WE Charity and the Rick Hansen Foundation launched a joint venture to advocate for increased accessibility throughout Canada. The initiative was announced as part of WE Day Ottawa, on November 15. The goal of the initiative is to make every building in Canada fully accessible within 30 years. As part of this effort, RHF developed a program to evaluate and promote accessibility across Canada. The program was added to WE Schools curriculum in over 14,500 schools across Canada, the U.S. and the UK.

Hansen has made several on stage appearances at WE Day events, speaking in front of thousands of students about overcoming disabilities and inspiring others to be active in their communities. He also helped WE develop ideas for improved accessibility to their Global Learning Centre in Toronto, which was inaugurated during the same year.

Hansen earned a bachelor's degree in physical education in 1986 from the University of British Columbia, Vancouver.

Controversies
On June 23, 2013, Vancouver Sun columnist David Baines published a lengthy and detailed investigative story about the finances of Hansen and his various foundations and groups. The article, entitled "Behind the Rick Hansen Foundation: Charity's Financial Stewardship Questioned" reveals, among other things, that "in 2009, Hansen donated rights to his name [to the Rick Hansen Foundation] for $1.8 million. In return, he received a $1.8-million tax receipt." It also states that Hansen's salary prior to resigning from his positions as president and CEO in 2011 was "more than $400,000 a year; how much more is not clear."
 
After his 2011 resignation, he became co-chairman of the foundation (with Lyall Knott) and re-structured his relationship with the foundation by having it create the 'Rick Hansen Leadership Group,' a not-for-profit society that "is technically controlled by the foundation but headed by Hansen and includes two assistants". That restructuring "removed Hansen from the foundation's direct payroll. Instead of paying him directly, the foundation now pays him indirectly through the leadership group"; as a consequence, the foundation does not report any compensation level for him in its CRA returns.

Professional background
President and CEO, Rick Hansen Foundation (1997–present)
National Fellow, Rick Hansen National Fellow Programme, University of British Columbia (1990–present)
Consultant on Disability Issues to the President, University of British Columbia (1989–1991)
Commissioner General to Canada Pavilion at World Exposition '88 in Brisbane, Australia (1987–1988)

Awards and honours
 Special Achievement Award, University of British Columbia (1979–1982)
 "Outstanding Athlete of the Year," by Canadian Wheelchair Sports Association (1980)
 Lou Marsh Trophy, auxiliary award of special merit winner (1982)
 Outstanding Young Person of the World for personal improvement and accomplishment by Junior Chamber International (1983)
 University of British Columbia's Alumni Award of Distinction (1983)
 Athlete of the Week: by ABC Wide World of Sports (1983)
 British Columbia Sports Hall of Fame, W.A.C. Bennett Award (1983)
 Newsmaker of the Year by Canadian Press (1986)
 Terry Fox Hall of Fame (1993)
 W.A.C. Bennett Award (BC Sports Hall of Fame and Museum) (1994)
 Induction into Canada's Sports Hall of Fame (2006)
 Canada's Walk of Fame (2007)
 Recipient of CPA Alberta's Christopher Reeve Award (2007)
 UBC Sports Hall of Fame
 William Van Horne Visionary Award (2006)
 Royal Bank Award (1994)
 University of British Columbia Athletic Hall of Fame (1994)
 People in Motion, a not-for-profit organization was named after Hansen
 Four public schools have been named after Hansen:
 Rick Hansen Secondary School, Abbotsford, British Columbia
 Rick Hansen Secondary School, Mississauga, Ontario
 Rick Hansen Elementary School, London, Ontario
 Rick Hansen Public School, Aurora, Ontario

Order of Canada Citation

Hansen was appointed a Companion of the Order of Canada on June 29, 1987. His citation reads:
Already a world-renowned wheelchair athlete, this British-Columbian fulfilled a dream of wheeling around the world to make others aware of the potential of the disabled and to raise funds for spinal cord research among other things. His 44,075 km. journey, recently completed, took him to four continents and 34 countries, inspiring people around the world to realize their potential and raising many millions of dollars for the cause.

Honorary appointments
 Honorary Director, Ontario Neurotrauma Foundation (2002)
 Honorary Board member, Think First Foundation (1998–2000)
 Honorary Chair, Brain and Spinal Cord Research Centre Campaign, Faculty of Medicine, University of British Columbia (1995)
 Honorary Patron, B.C. Aboriginal Network on Disability Society (1995–Present)
 Honorary Chair, Grey Cup Festival (1994)
 Honorary Chair, Active Living Alliance for Canadians with a Disability (1990–Present)
 Honorary Chair, Alberta Premier's Advisory Council for Persons with Disabilities (1989–Present)
 Honorary Chair, BC Premier's Advisory Council for Persons with Disabilities (1989–Present)

Hansen was named Commissioner General for the Canadian Pavilion at Expo '88 in Brisbane, Queensland, Australia. In 1986, a township in Sudbury District, Ontario, previously named the Geographical Township of Stalin, altered its name to the Township of Hansen in the athlete's honour. It is now within the boundary of the municipality of Killarney.

Books
Hansen is the co-author of two books: the autobiographical Rick Hansen: Man in Motion, written with Jim Taylor (published in 1987), and the self-help book Going the Distance: 7 steps to personal change, written with Dr. Joan Laub.

Personal life
Hansen and his wife Amanda Reid first met during his Man in Motion World Tour as she was his physiotherapist. They married in 1987 and have three daughters.

Honours

Commonwealth honours

Scholastic

 Chancellor, visitor, governor, rector and fellowships

 Honorary Degrees

Honorary military appointments

References

External links

 – Rick Hansen Foundation
CBC Digital Archives – Rick Hansen: Man In Motion

Praxis Spinal Cord Institute – Previously the Rick Hansen Institute

1957 births
Activists from British Columbia
Athletes (track and field) at the 1980 Summer Paralympics
Athletes (track and field) at the 1984 Summer Paralympics
Canadian disabled sportspeople
Canadian Disability Hall of Fame
Canadian disability rights activists
Canadian humanitarians
Canadian male wheelchair racers
Canadian people of Norwegian descent
Canadian philanthropists
Companions of the Order of Canada
Living people
Lou Marsh Trophy winners
Medalists at the 1980 Summer Paralympics
Medalists at the 1984 Summer Paralympics
Members of the Order of British Columbia
Paralympic bronze medalists for Canada
Paralympic gold medalists for Canada
Paralympic medalists in athletics (track and field)
Paralympic silver medalists for Canada
Paralympic track and field athletes of Canada
People from Port Alberni
People with paraplegia
Sportspeople from British Columbia
University of British Columbia Faculty of Education alumni
Wheelchair racers at the 1984 Summer Olympics
Wheelchair users